The Stevens Boys Rifles were a series of single-shot takedown rifles produced by Stevens Arms from the late 19th until the mid-20th century. The rifles used a falling-block action (sometimes called a tilting-block, dropping-block, or drop-block) and were chambered in a variety of rimfire calibers, such as .22LR, .22 Short, .25 Rimfire, and .32 Rimfire.

History 

In 1890, Stevens Arms released its first "Boys Rifle" (a term referring to an inexpensive rifle marketed towards children) known as the Crack Shot. This rifle would undergo at least two revisions during its production lifespan. At its introduction, the breechblock was actuated with a lever found on the side of the rifle, a system that would remain on the Crack Shot until 1912. At this point, a new version of the Crack Shot (designated the No. 26) was produced, featuring both a redesigned action and the familiar under-lever (patented together as Patent No. 1,059,477). The Crack Shot would remain unchanged until produced ceased in 1939, with the exception of a brief production run of a modified Crack Shot in 1943.

In 1902, Stevens Arms filed a patent for the takedown mechanism that would be used on the Boys Rifles.

The No. 14 Little Scout was produced from 1906 to 1910, during which time one shortcoming of the Boys Rifle design was addressed: the rifles were only initially equipped with an extractor, but no ejector. This meant that a casing would be partially removed from the chamber upon actuation of the lever, but would not be ejected out of the chamber and away from the rifle. Instead, the user was required to remove the casing from the chamber with their fingers. In 1909, a patent from Stevens Arms sought to remedy this with the inclusion of an ejector proper which would quickly and sharply snap rearwards to throw an empty cartridge out of the chamber.

Design 

The Stevens Boys Rifles were all similar in that they were single-shot rimfire rifles with falling-block actions and could be easily taken down into two-halves with the removal of a knurled thumb screw on the bottom of the receiver. The rifles were equipped with an oval-shape walnut or walnut-varnished stock and steel butt plate.

Models 

A wide number of different models and variations of Boys Rifles were produced over their production lifespan.

Safety

Use of high-velocity ammunition 
Because the Stevens Boys Rifles predate modern high-velocity ammunition such as CCI Stingers and Velocitors, it is conceivable that the actions were not designed or intended to be used with any ammunition producing a chamber pressure beyond what was in use at the time of their invention. Using ammunition that produces a higher chamber pressure than an action is capable of withstanding could lead to damage to the firearm, or even a dangerous and catastrophic failure of the action.

Excessive headspace 
Rifles of this kind (including for example the BSA No. 12/15 and 15) can develop excessive headspace due to gradual wear on the locking shoulders of the breechblock and the locking arms on the finger lever. This results in an action that does not close tightly, therefore failing to support the (typically brass) cartridge case properly. Cases that are unsupported are free to expand beyond their intended dimensional limit, leading to weakened, deformed, or even ruptured casings. The rupturing of an unsupported case releases hot, high pressure gases rearward towards the shooter and bystanders, leading to serious injury or even death.

References

Single-shot rifles
Rifles of the United States
Falling-block rifles